Ringstad may refer to the following locations:

Ringstad, Nordland, a village in Bø municipality in Nordland county, Norway
Ringstad, Innlandet, a village in Gran municipality in Innlandet county, Norway